Tyche may refer to:

 Tyche, an ancient Greek goddess
 258 Tyche, an asteroid
 Tyche (hypothetical planet), a gas giant planet in our outer Solar System, now disproven.
 Tyche, a suburb of the city of Syracuse, Sicily